CeeLo Green's The Good Life is an American comedy series created and hosted by CeeLo Green. It premiered on TBS on June 23, 2014. It was cancelled by TBS on September 2, 2014.

Plot
The series follows CeeLo Green and life in the city with his friends, fellow members of the Goodie Mob, doing wild and crazy things.

Episodes

Cancellation
On September 2, 2014, TBS confirmed that the show was cancelled following tweets by Green in which he expressed controversial views about what constitutes rape.

References

TBS (American TV channel) original programming
2010s American comedy television series
2014 American television series debuts
2014 American television series endings